Fulton Public Library is a historic library building located at Fulton in Oswego County, New York.  It is a masonry structure built in 1905–1906 in the Beaux-Arts style.  The building is built on a steeply sloped lot and is two stories at street level and four stories behind.  It was designed and built  with funds provided by the philanthropist Andrew Carnegie.   It is one of 3,000 such libraries constructed between 1885 and 1919, and one of 107 in New York State. Carnegie provided $15,000 toward the construction of the Fulton library.

It was listed on the National Register of Historic Places in 1999.

References

External links
Home - Fulton Public Library
Fulton Public Library - Fulton, NY - U.S. National Register of Historic Places on Waymarking.com

Library buildings completed in 1905
Libraries on the National Register of Historic Places in New York (state)
Beaux-Arts architecture in New York (state)
Carnegie libraries in New York (state)
Buildings and structures in Oswego County, New York
National Register of Historic Places in Oswego County, New York
1905 establishments in New York (state)